The Llano Kid is a 1939 Western film starring Tito Guízar in the title role of Enrique Ibarra/the Llano Kid. Released on December 8, 1939, it was a remake of Gary Cooper's 1930 film The Texan. The Llano Kid was directed by Edward Venturini. Others in the film include Gale Sondergaard as Lora Travers, Alan Mowbray as John Travers, and Jan Clayton as Lupita Sandoval.

Plot
The Llano Kid is a romantic highwayman who robs stagecoaches along the Texas-Mexico border. In the film, John and Lora Travers are searching for Enrique Ibarra to inform him that he is the heir to a substantial fortune and ranch/hacienda south of the border. If they find him, they will receive a significant reward. During their search for Ibarra, their stage falls victim to the Llano Kid. Noticing that the Llano Kid bear an uncanny resemblance to Ibarra, the Travers conspire to persuade the Kid to pose as Ibarra so they can collect their reward.

External links
 

1939 films
1939 Western (genre) films
Films scored by Victor Young
American black-and-white films
Paramount Pictures films
Remakes of American films
American Western (genre) films
Adaptations of works by O. Henry
Films with screenplays by Wanda Tuchock
1930s English-language films
1930s American films